Crocomela albolineata is a moth of the subfamily Arctiinae. It was described by Herbert Druce in 1911. It is found in Colombia and northern Ecuador.

References

Arctiinae
Moths described in 1911